Tang Jiali (born 16 March 1995) is a Chinese professional footballer who plays for Spanish Liga F club Madrid CFF and the China women's national team. She most recently played on loan with Tottenham Hotspur in England's FA WSL.

Club career
On 21 July 2021, Tang joined FA WSL side Tottenham Hotspur on loan for until the end of the 2021–22 season.

International career
Having played for the Chinese under-17 national team and the Chinese under-20 national team, Tang made her debut for the Chinese women's national team in a 1–1 draw against the United States on 10 December 2014 during the 2014 Torneio Internacional de Brasília.

International goals

References

External links
 
 

1995 births
Living people
Chinese women's footballers
China women's international footballers
Tottenham Hotspur F.C. Women players
Women's Super League players
Chinese expatriate sportspeople in England
Expatriate women's footballers in England
2015 FIFA Women's World Cup players
Footballers from Heilongjiang
People from Mudanjiang
Women's association football midfielders